Events from the year 1971 in Iran.

Incumbents
 Shah: Mohammad Reza Pahlavi 
 Prime Minister: Amir-Abbas Hoveida

Events
2 February: Ramsar Convention 
8 February: Siahkal incident
9 July: 1971 Iranian legislative election
12–16 October: 2,500 year celebration of the Persian Empire
30 November: Abu Musa and the Greater and Lesser Tunbs conflict

Births
 12 June – Arman Alizad, tailor, columnist and TV personality
 28 July – Mansour
 10 November – Niki Karimi
 Mojtaba Mirtahmasb

See also
 Years in Iraq
 Years in Afghanistan

References

 
Iran
Years of the 20th century in Iran
1970s in Iran
Iran